Kurumi Nara was the defending champion, but chose not to participate.
Chichi Scholl won the final against Amanda Fink 6–1, 6–1.

Seeds

Main draw

Finals

Top half

Bottom half

References
 Main Draw
 Qualifying Draw

Fifth Third Bank Tennis Championships - Singles
2011 WS